or   is the reconstructed Proto-Germanic name of the l-rune ,  meaning "water" or "lake" and  meaning "leek". In the Anglo-Saxon rune poem, it is called  "ocean". In the Younger Futhark, the rune is called  "waterfall" in Icelandic and  "water" in Norse.

The corresponding Gothic letter is 𐌻 l, named . The rune is identical in shape to the letter l in the Raetic alphabet.

The "leek" hypothesis is based not on the rune poems, but rather on early inscriptions where the rune has been hypothesized to abbreviate , a symbol of fertility, see the Bülach fibula.

See also
Elder Futhark
Rune poem

References

Runes